NADH dehydrogenase [ubiquinone] 1 beta subcomplex subunit 10 is an enzyme that in humans is encoded by the NDUFB10 gene. NADH dehydrogenase (ubiquinone) 1 beta subcomplex subunit 10 is an accessory subunit of the NADH dehydrogenase (ubiquinone) complex, located in the mitochondrial inner membrane. It is also known as Complex I and is the largest of the five complexes of the electron transport chain.

Gene 

The NDUFB10 gene is located on the p arm of chromosome 16 in position 13.3 and is 2,459 base pairs long.

Structure 

The NDUFB10 protein weighs 21 kDa and is composed of 172 amino acids. NDUFB10 is a subunit of the enzyme NADH dehydrogenase (ubiquinone), the largest of the respiratory complexes. The structure is L-shaped with a long, hydrophobic transmembrane domain and a hydrophilic domain for the peripheral arm that includes all the known redox centers and the NADH binding site. It has been noted that the N-terminal hydrophobic domain has the potential to be folded into an alpha helix spanning the inner mitochondrial membrane with a C-terminal hydrophilic domain interacting with globular subunits of Complex I. The highly conserved two-domain structure suggests that this feature is critical for the protein function and that the hydrophobic domain acts as an anchor for the NADH dehydrogenase (ubiquinone) complex at the inner mitochondrial membrane.

Function 

The protein encoded by this gene is an accessory subunit of the multisubunit NADH:ubiquinone oxidoreductase (complex I) that is not directly involved in catalysis. Mammalian complex I is composed of 45 different subunits. It locates at the mitochondrial inner membrane. This protein complex has NADH dehydrogenase activity and oxidoreductase activity. It transfers electrons from NADH to the respiratory chain. The immediate electron acceptor for the enzyme is believed to be ubiquinone. Alternative splicing occurs at this locus and two transcript variants encoding distinct isoforms have been identified. Initially, NADH binds to Complex I and transfers two electrons to the isoalloxazine ring of the flavin mononucleotide (FMN) prosthetic arm to form FMNH2. The electrons are transferred through a series of iron-sulfur (Fe-S) clusters in the prosthetic arm and finally to coenzyme Q10 (CoQ), which is reduced to ubiquinol (CoQH2). The flow of electrons changes the redox state of the protein, resulting in a conformational change and pK shift of the ionizable side chain, which pumps four hydrogen ions out of the mitochondrial matrix.

References

Further reading 

 
 
 
 
 

Human proteins